The 2004 Kerry Senior Football Championship was the 104th staging of the Kerry Senior Football Championship since its establishment by the Kerry County Board in 1889. The draw for the opening round fixtures took place on 25 March 2004. The championship ran from 7 May to 18 December 2004.

An Ghaeltacht entered the championship as the defending champions, however, they were beaten by Laune Rangers in the semi-finals.

The final was played on 7 November 2004 at FitzGerald Stadium in Killarney, between South Kerry and Laune Rangers in what was their first ever meeting in the final. South Kerry won the match by 1-13 to 2-05 to claim their sixth championship title overall and a first title in 22 years.

Colm Cooper was the championship's top scorer with 3-21.

Results

Round 1

Round 2

Relegation playoff

Round 3

Quarter-finals

Semi-finals

Final

Championship statistics

Top scorers

Overall

In a single game

Miscellaneous
 South Kerry won their first title since 1982.
 Laune Rangers became the first team to lose back-to-back finals since Austin Stacks in 1980-81.
 Milltown/Castlemaine played in the Munster Senior Club Football Championship after winning the Kerry Club Football Championship.
 Milltown/Castlemaine made their first appearance in the senior championship.
 Despite losing the Relegation Play-Off John Mitchels took their senior status.

References

Kerry Senior Football Championship
2004 in Gaelic football